El Cuartón is a village in the municipality of Tarifa in the Province of Cadiz in southeastern Spain. According to the National Statistics Institute, El Cuartón had 164 inhabitants in 2009.

References

Populated places in the Province of Cádiz
Tarifa